Arnoldo Jimenez (born February 19, 1982) is an American fugitive who was added to the FBI Ten Most Wanted Fugitives list on May 8, 2019. He is wanted for the May 2012 murder of his wife Estrella Carrera on the day after their wedding; she was found dead in a bathtub at her apartment in Burbank, Illinois. Jimenez was the 522nd fugitive to be placed on the FBI's Ten Most Wanted Fugitives list. The FBI is offering a reward of up to $100,000 for information leading to his capture.

Background
Arnoldo Jimenez and Estrella Carrera were married on May 11, 2012, at Chicago City Hall. Carrera had two children, one 9-year-old daughter from a previous relationship, and a 2-year-old son with Jimenez. The couple had dinner with family and friends that night and then headed to a night club, which they left around 4 a.m. on the morning of May 12.

Murder
It is believed by the FBI that on the way home the couple got into a heated argument in Jimenez's black 2006 four-door Maserati. Jimenez then fatally stabbed Carrera multiple times in his car and dragged her body into her apartment. Carrera's body was dumped in the bathtub at her apartment, and she was still wearing the same silver dress she wore to her wedding.

Carrera was meant to pick up her children from family members on May 12, but she never showed up. Her family members then reported her missing to police. Her body was found inside her apartment on the afternoon of May 13. Police confirmed there was no sign of a forced entry. Jimenez had also disappeared and his car was nowhere to be found.

Three days later on May 15, Jimenez was charged with first degree murder and a state warrant was issued for his arrest. A federal warrant followed after he was charged with unlawful flight to avoid prosecution on May 17.

Investigation
Investigators began tracking Jimenez and found that on May 12 he had used his cellphone in Chicago, then Southern Illinois. It was later used in Memphis, Tennessee, and then in Arkansas. On May 13 he had made calls from Houston and then in Hidalgo, Mexico.

In September 2012, police made a drug arrest on Jimenez's brother, Humberto. During the search of his property, police discovered Arnoldo's black Maserati in the garage. Blood was found inside the car, leading police to the conclusion that Jimenez had killed Carrera in his car and dragged her body into the bathtub inside her apartment. Police believe Humberto drove Arnoldo to Mexico in his car and left him there.

The FBI believes Jimenez is still hiding in Durango, Mexico, specifically in the area of Santiago Papasquiaro. He may also be hiding in Reynosa, Tamaulipas, Mexico.

See also
List of fugitives from justice who disappeared

References

1982 births
2012 murders in the United States
American male criminals
People charged with murder
FBI Ten Most Wanted Fugitives
Fugitives wanted by the United States
Fugitives wanted on murder charges
Living people